Maksim Nikolayevich Mishchenko is a Russian politician, deputy of the State Duma, founder and leader of the youth movement Young Russia.

Biography
Born in the city of Taganrog on July 9, 1977. In 1994 went to Moscow and entered the Bauman Moscow State Technical University, which he graduated in 2000. Since 2005 - leader of the youth movement Young Russia.

In December 2007, he was elected deputy of State Duma at 2007 Russian legislative election from Chelyabinsk Oblast's list of political party United Russia. Member of the State Duma's committee for youth affairs.

External links
Information from the Russian State Duma web site
Maxim Mishenko on Russia.Ru
personal blog

Politicians from Taganrog
1977 births
Living people
Fifth convocation members of the State Duma (Russian Federation)